Three submarines of the British Royal Navy have been named HMS Talent:

 , a T-class submarine transferred to the Royal Netherlands Navy as HNLMS Zwaardvisch in 1943.
 HMS Talent was another T-class submarine, ordered in 1944, but cancelled in 1945.
  was another T-class submarine, previously named HMS Tasman but renamed shortly before commissioning in 1945.  She served until 1966.
 , a  launched in 1988 and decommissioned in 2022

Royal Navy ship names